20 Years in a Montana Missile Solo is the sixteenth studio album by American band Pere Ubu. It was released on September 29, 2017, through Cherry Red Records. The album was dedicated to Paul Hamann, the engineer owner of Suma Recording Studio, who died on September 14, 2017.

Track listing
All tracks composed by Pere Ubu:

Personnel
Pere Ubu
David Thomas - vocals
Gary Siperko, Keith Moliné - guitar
Kristof Hahn - steel guitar
Michele Temple - bass
Robert Wheeler - analog synthesizers, Theremin 
Steve Mehlman - drums
Darryl Boon - clarinet
Roshi Nasehi - additional vocals

References

2017 albums
Cherry Red Records albums
Pere Ubu albums